Home Page is a 1999 documentary by Doug Block on the genesis of weblogs and the lives of early independent content producers on the Internet.  It was filmed between 1996 and 1998.  The film premiered at the Sundance Film Festival, and was released in limited theaters in New York City, while being made available on home video and on iFilm, simultaneously.

Cast
The documentary focuses on the personal lives of some of the people involved with ground-breaking Internet sites of the time, including Justin's Links from the Underground, suck.com, Cybergrrl, HotWired, and Feed Magazine.

Personalities filmed in the documentary include:
 Justin Hall
 Sammi Quince
 Joey Anuff
 Carl Steadman
 Steven Johnson
 Stefanie Syman
 Jaime Levy
 Aliza Sherman
  Julie Peterson
 Howard Rheingold

Reaction
Home Page was nominated for the Grand Jury Prize at the 1999 Sundance Film Festival.  Roger Ebert named the movie his pick of the festival and the movie was named one of the best documentaries of the year by the Chicago Sun-Times.

References

External links

The Home Page homepage - Official production site
Making Movies on Cyber-Location from the Austin Chronicle

American documentary films
American blogs
Films directed by Doug Block
1999 films
1999 documentary films
Documentary films about the Internet
History of the Internet
1990s American films